Waggrakine is an outer northern suburb of Geraldton, Western Australia in the local government area of the City of Greater Geraldton.

The suburb was gazetted in 1979.

References

Suburbs of Geraldton